George Ellis Pierce (13 Oct 1909 – 29 Jun 1981), was a decorated submarine commander during World War II who reached the rank of rear admiral in the United States Navy.

Pierce was born in 1909 to Dr. Claude Connor Pierce Sr. and Shirley Pierce (née Reeves) in Colón, Panama, while Dr. Pierce was serving there with the United States Public Health Service. His older brother John Reeves Pierce graduated from the United States Naval Academy in 1928, and George followed him in 1932. Pierce began his career in the Navy with submarines, but later transferred to dirigibles. Upon hearing of his brother's death, Pierce immediately volunteered for submarine duty. Pierce commanded the USS Tunny on her 7th, 8th, and 9th war patrol, being awarded the Navy Cross for the 8th and 9th war patrols.

References

1909 births
1981 deaths
United States Navy rear admirals (lower half)
United States Navy personnel of World War II
People from Colón, Panama
Burials at Arlington National Cemetery
United States Navy personnel of the Korean War
Recipients of the Navy Cross (United States)
United States Naval Academy alumni
Place of death missing
United States submarine commanders